KZBX-LP is a radio station licensed to Williams, Arizona, broadcasting on 92.1 MHz FM.  The station airs an Oldies format, playing music from the 1950s, 1960s, and 1970s. KZBX-LP is owned by First Baptist Church of Williams, Arizona.

References

External links
 KZBX-LP's website
 

ZBX-LP
Oldies radio stations in the United States